Luisa Ranieri (born 16 December 1973) is an Italian actress.  She has been seen in a number of miniseries on RAI and has appeared in numerous films, including 2004's Eros and 2021's The Hand of God.

Callas e Onassis
Ranieri is best known for her television movie portrayal of the opera diva Maria Callas in the 2005 Italian television film Callas e Onassis, which began her acting career. Though a number of fiction and nonfiction movies, and documentaries, have been done on the late shipping magnate billionaire Aristotle Onassis, and of Callas, the TV movie Callas e Onassis is the only television or movie depiction ever made exclusively devoted to the public and private deep emotional relationship and close friendship between Onassis and Callas.

Other appearances
Ranieri had a noteworthy acting performance in the 2010 drama film Letters to Juliet as one of Juliet's secretaries, who is the closest to Sophie, played by Amanda Seyfried. She also played the role of Assunta Goretti, the mother of Maria Goretti, in the 2003 film Maria Goretti, an Italian television movie based on real-life events of the Catholic virgin-martyr and saint, Maria Goretti. In 2014, Ranieri hosted the opening and closing nights of the 71st Venice International Film Festival in Venice, Italy.

Filmography

Films

Television

References

External links
 

1973 births
Living people
Italian television actresses
Actresses from Naples
Italian film actresses
21st-century Italian actresses
Italian television presenters
Italian women television presenters
Mass media people from Naples